Bertram Victor Ralphs (27 August 1896 – 14 November 1942) was an English footballer who played in the Football League for Blackburn Rovers, Chesterfield, Crewe Alexandra and Stoke.

Career
Ralphs had an interesting career as a 'fast and enterprising winger' who occasionally played as in inside-forward. He began playing football just before World War I with his works team Dennison's before he turned out for Reading and Nuneaton. After the end of the conflict Ralphs turned professional and signed for Blackburn Rovers. He played in 40 league matches scoring six goals for Rovers before being signed by Stoke in 1922. His first season with the "Potters" ended in disappointment as the club suffered relegation from the First Division. He spent the next season as back up to Tommy Broad before establishing himself as first choice right winger and was an ever-present during the 1924–25 season. He spent one more season with Stoke before leaving for Chesterfield in 1926. He later went on to play for Crewe Alexandra and Stafford Rangers.

Personal life 
Ralphs served as a private in the Royal Army Medical Corps during the First World War.

Career statistics

References

English footballers
Blackburn Rovers F.C. players
Chesterfield F.C. players
Crewe Alexandra F.C. players
Stoke City F.C. players
English Football League players
1896 births
Reading F.C. players
Nuneaton Borough F.C. players
Stafford Rangers F.C. players
Footballers from Handsworth, West Midlands
1942 deaths
Association football outside forwards
Colwyn Bay F.C. players
Northwich Victoria F.C. players
British Army personnel of World War I
Royal Army Medical Corps soldiers